Myklebost or Myklebust is a village on the southern end of the island of Harøya in Ålesund Municipality in Møre og Romsdal county, Norway. There are ferry connections from Myklebost to Fjørtofta and Brattvåg in Haram Municipality and to Dryna in Midsund Municipality. The Myklebost area was a part of Haram Municipality until 1965.

This tunnel is part of the Nordøyvegen project that will connect several islands to the mainland upon its completion in 2022.

References

Villages in Møre og Romsdal
Ålesund